Kozí Vrbovok is a village and municipality in the Krupina District of the Banská Bystrica Region of Slovakia,  south-south east of Krupina. As of 2013 it had a population of 169 people. The municipality covers an area of 5.34 km².

History
The first written mention of Kozí Vrbovok comes from 1262, when the Hungarian king Belo IV gave the territory to the Kaza family, and it was documented in 1415 as an asset of the local gentry. In 1241, the area came into the hands of the Tartars, who attacked the monastery in the nearby settlement of Bzovík. The monastery was attacked again in 1433 and pillaged. The village was struck hard by the plague in 1644. In 1808, during the Ottoman period, it was referred to on a map as "Kecske Varbok".

In 1964, the municipality underwent improvements in infrastructure, with water supply and irrigation, a kindergarten with capacity for 30 children and a primary school.

References

External links
  
Surnames of living people in Kozi Vrbovok

Villages and municipalities in Krupina District